Erruca hanga is a moth of the family Erebidae. It was described by Gottlieb August Wilhelm Herrich-Schäffer in 1854. It is found in the Brazilian states of São Paulo, Espírito Santo and Rio de Janeiro.

References

Moths described in 1854